Bangladesh Hindu Buddhist Christian Unity Council also known as the Bangladesh Hindu Bouddha Christian Oikyo Parishod is a non-profitable organization established to protect the human rights of the religious and ethnic minorities of Bangladesh. BHBCUC is not biased to any religion or political parties or government and not meant for economic or any personal interest. The members and public donations are the source of fund for this charitable organization.

History 
This non-partisan organization was initially founded in 1975 in Dhaka, Bangladesh by Chitta Ranjan Dutta, the retired Major General of Bangladesh Army. It was officially founded in June 1988 by Chitta Ranjan Dutta with other two current presidents of BHBCUC, Bodhipal Mohathero and Mr. T.D. Rosario. On 9 June 1988, Islam was declared as State Religion with Eighth Amendment Act of the Constitution of Bangladesh, on that very day BHBCUC was formed, although announcement was done sometimes later. 9 June was observed as Black Day by BHBCUC. Later, in 1990, the non-resident Bangladeshi minorities of North America had formed a division of BHBCUC in New York. A Canadian chapter was formed in 2005 in Toronto. It also has branches in European counties like France.

References

External links 

 
 Articles at India Times
 Rana Dasgupta, general secretary of Bangladesh Hindu Buddhist Christian Unity Council at Indian Express

Human rights organisations based in Bangladesh
Organizations established in 1988